Suzana Cimbal Špirelja (born November 18, 1975 in Zagreb) is a Croatian sport shooter. She is also a full-time member at HAŠK Mladost Shooting Club, and is currently coached and trained by Miroslav Pavlakovic.

At age thirty-three, Spirelja made her official debut for the 2008 Summer Olympics in Beijing, where she competed in two rifle shooting events. She placed thirtieth out of forty-seven shooters in the women's 10 m air rifle, with a total score of 393 points. Nearly a week later, Spirelja competed for her second event, 50 m rifle 3 positions, where she was able to shoot 199 targets in a prone position, 192 in standing, and 189 in kneeling, for a total score of 580 points, finishing only in twelfth place.

References

External links
NBC Olympics Profile

Croatian female sport shooters
Living people
Olympic shooters of Croatia
Shooters at the 2008 Summer Olympics
Sportspeople from Zagreb
1975 births
21st-century Croatian women